Goniocellus is a genus of beetles in the family Carabidae, containing the following species:

 Goniocellus bifossifrons Casey, 1914
 Goniocellus isthmianus Casey, 1914

References

Harpalinae